MedinTux is a free healthcare software for managing consultations, written for the French environment.

Features
Originally written for the French emergency services, its modular conception allow it to be used in almost any area of medical or paramedical specialization.

The software works in a networked and multi-users environment. The following features are currently available:
consultations
meetings
prescriptions
monitoring of static or dynamic variables
ICD-10, CCAM, CCMU and GEMSA codings
statistics
Vidal Data Semp
retrieval of analysis via FTP
real time visualisation of biometric curves
management of multimedia documents (images...)
OCR
accounting
easy input  with hierarchy menus, which can be parametrised

Software architecture
The program is written in C++, using the Qt3 library and Mysql database for storage. A web enabled MedWebTux also exist, which allow access from a browser. It's been ported to various OS:
Linux (tested on Mandriva, Ubuntu, SuSE, Xandros eeePC)
Microsoft Windows
macOS

Awards
Winner of the 2005 Trophées du libre, in the enterprise management category.
Nominated at the 2007 Lutèce d'Or

References

External links
  Official site
  Medintux on the ADULLACT GForge
  MedinTux-Evolution

Free health care software
Healthcare software for macOS
Healthcare software for Windows
Healthcare software for Linux
Software that uses Qt